Bradysia nigrispina is a species of fungus gnat found in the British Isles.

References

Further reading
 Rudzinski, Hans-Georg, and Jan Ševčík. "Fungus gnats (Diptera: Sciaroidea) of the Gemer region (Central Slovakia): Part 3–Sciaridae." Casopis slezskeho zemskeho muzea (A) 61.2 (2012): 143–157.

External links

ADW

Sciaridae
Insects described in 2006